The Men's 62 kg weightlifting event at the 2014 Commonwealth Games in Glasgow, Scotland, took place at Scottish Exhibition and Conference Centre on 25 July.

Result
The final results:

References

Weightlifting at the 2014 Commonwealth Games